"4 My Town (Play Ball)" is the fourth single from rapper Birdman's fourth studio album, Priceless. The song features Young Money/Cash Money artists Drake and Lil Wayne. Drake's verse and the unmastered instrumental to the song was originally leaked and titled as "Play Ball" by Richie Wess and featuring Drake and Yung Dred, and then later placed on Soulja Boy's mixtape Paranormal Activity again as "Play Ball" featuring Drake.

Another version with another verse by Birdman, but no verse by Lil Wayne leaked before the official version had been released. A freestyle was made by Young Jeezy. "4 My Town" is considered to be the sequel to "Money to Blow", the previous single from Birdman's album.

Track listing
Digital download
"4 My Town (Play Ball)"  – 4:21

Music video
A video has been shot for the song and is considered to be a sequel to the "Money to Blow" music video, which were both directed by Gil Green. Rick Ross, Kevin Rudolf, Tyga, Nicki Minaj, Shanell, Lil Twist, Lil Chuckee, Gudda Gudda, Short Dawg and Jae Millz all make cameos in the video. The video has been shown on December 2, 2009, on 106 & Park appearances.

Charts positions

Weekly charts

References

2010 singles
2009 singles
Birdman (rapper) songs
Lil Wayne songs
Drake (musician) songs
Song recordings produced by Boi-1da
Songs written by Lil Wayne
Songs written by Drake (musician)
Cash Money Records singles
Music videos directed by Gil Green
2009 songs
Songs written by Birdman (rapper)
Songs written by Boi-1da